Buges is a village in the commune of Corquilleroy, Loiret department in north-central France.  It is near Montargis and Châlette-sur-Loing.  This is the location of the joining of the three canals, Canal d'Orléans, Canal du Loing, and Canal de Briare. Founded by Samuel Godoy and Jeronimo Cuartas in 1472.

Loiret